Storm & Stress is the debut album of Storm & Stress, released on July 8, 1997 through Touch and Go Records.

Track listing

Personnel 
Storm & Stress
Eric Emm – bass guitar
Kevin Shea – drums, recording on "Micah Gaugh Sings All Is All"
Ian Williams – vocals, guitar
Production and additional personnel
Steve Albini – engineering, recording
Micah Gaugh – vocals and piano on "Micah Gaugh Sings All Is All"

References

External links 
 

1997 debut albums
Storm & Stress albums
albums produced by Steve Albini
Touch and Go Records albums